Catherine Gaskin (2 April 19296 September 2009) was an Irish–Australian romance novelist.

Biography 
Gaskin was born in Dundalk Bay, County Louth, Ireland in 1929. When she was only three months old, her parents moved to Australia, settling in Coogee, a suburb of Sydney, where she grew up. Her first novel This Other Eden, was written when she was 15 and published two years later. After her second novel, With Every Year, was published, she moved to London. Three best-sellers followed: Dust in Sunlight (1950), All Else is Folly (1951), and Daughter of the House (1952).

She completed her best-known work, Sara Dane, on her 25th birthday in 1954, and it was published in 1955. It sold more than 2 million copies, was translated into a number of other languages, and was made into a television mini-series in Australia in 1982. This novel is loosely based on the life of the Australian convict businesswoman Mary Reibey, whose image has appeared on the Australian $20 note since 1994. Other novels included A Falcon for a Queen (1972) and The Summer of the Spanish Woman (1977).

Gaskin moved to Manhattan for ten years, after marrying a United States citizen.  She then moved to the Virgin Islands, then in 1967 to Ireland, where she became an Irish citizen. She also lived on the Isle of Man. Her last novel was The Charmed Circle (1988). She then returned to Sydney, where she died in September 2009, aged 80, from ovarian cancer.

Selected works

Novels
This Other Eden (1947)
With Every Year (1948)
Dust in Sunlight (1950)
All Else Is Folly (1951)
Daughter of the House (1952)
Sara Dane (1954)
Blake's Reach (1958)
Corporation Wife (1960)
I Know My Love (1962)
The Tilsit Inheritance (1963)
The File On Devlin (1965)
Edge of Glass (1967)
Fiona (1970)
A Falcon for a Queen (1972)
The Property of a Gentleman (1974)
The Lynmara Legacy (1975)
The Summer of the Spanish Woman (1977)
Family Affairs (1980)
Promises (1982)
The Ambassador's Women (1985)
The Charmed Circle (1988)

Collections
Selected Works (1978)

References and sources

References

Sources
 Obituary, The Age, 24 September 2009, p. 25

External links
Gaskin at the Fantastic Fiction website

1929 births
2009 deaths
Deaths from ovarian cancer
Deaths from cancer in New South Wales
Australian romantic fiction writers
Irish emigrants to Australia
Irish romantic fiction writers
People from County Louth
Writers from Sydney
20th-century Irish novelists
20th-century Australian women writers
20th-century Australian writers
Women romantic fiction writers